Big Wave is an album by Japanese singer Misato Watanabe. It was released on July 21, 1993 by Sony Music Entertainment.

Track listing 

ブランニューヘブン
Overture（Instrumental）
ジャングル チャイルド
BIG WAVE やってきた
Nude
I WILL BE ALRIGHT
いつか きっと
若きモンスターの逆襲
みんないた夏
さえない20代
はじめて
素直に泣ける日 笑える日(Re-Mix)
Audrey

External links 
Sony Music Entertainment - Official site for Watanabe Misato. 
Album Page - Direct link to page with song listing and music samples.

1993 albums
Misato Watanabe albums